Two United States Navy ships have borne the name Tarawa, after the Tarawa Atoll that was the scene of a bloody fight in the Pacific War.

 The first  was an aircraft carrier in service from 1945 to 1960.
 The second  is an amphibious assault ship in service from 1976 to 2009.

United States Navy ship names